Brudziński/ Brudzinski (feminine: Brudzińska, plural: Brudzińscy) is a Polish surname

People
 Bob Brudzinski (born 1955), American football linebacker 
  (born 1959), Polish referee 
 Joachim Brudziński (born 1968), Polish Minister of the Interior, Deputy Marshal of the Sejm
 Józef Brudziński (1874–1917), Polish pediatrician 
 Magdalena Brudzińska, Sirrah (band) violinist 
  (1902–1960), Polish engineer 
  (1905–1959), Polish–Soviet War and Silesian Uprisings soldier

Other
 Brudziński's sign, medical signs which may occur in meningitis or meningism

See also
 
 Brodziński

Polish-language surnames